K I was a unique patrol submarine  of the Royal Netherlands Navy. The ship was built by De Schelde shipyard in Flushing.

Service history
The submarine was ordered on 19 October  1910 by the Ministry of Colonies. The next year on 16 September K I was  laid down in Flushing at the shipyard of De Schelde. The launch took place on 20 May 1913. On 15 July 1914 K I was commissioned in the Dutch navy.

12 September  1916 K I began her journey to the Dutch East Indies her theater of operations. For most of the journey she was towed by the tugboat Witte Zee. The route they took paused at The Downs, Vigo, Malta, the Suez Canal, Aden and Colombo arriving at Sabang on 6 November 1916. From Sabang to Batavia K I was escorted by the coastal defence ship .

The boat was decommissioned in 1928.

Design
The HNLMS K I was specially designed for the service in the Dutch East Indies, and then especially for doing service in the tropic weather. In order to parry the tropical heat for the vulnerable batteries, she had a large cooling system on board. Later on, an ingenious crew member connected the cooling installation to the ventilation system, which meant that the K I had an air conditioning system, even before it was officially invented.

References

External links
Description of ship

1913 ships
Ships built in Vlissingen
Submarines of the Royal Netherlands Navy
Submarines built by Koninklijke Maatschappij De Schelde